John Moráles (born 24 February 1939) is a Puerto Rican former basketball player. He competed in the men's tournament at the 1960 Summer Olympics.

References

External links
 

1939 births
Living people
Puerto Rican men's basketball players
Olympic basketball players of Puerto Rico
Basketball players at the 1960 Summer Olympics
Basketball players from New York City